Daba is a town under the administration of Renhuai, Guizhou, China. , it has Daba Residential Neighborhood and the following six villages under its administration:
Bojiba Village
Hongyang Village
Wucha Village
Xiao'ergou Village
Yanping Village
Xintian Village

References 

Township-level divisions of Guizhou
Renhuai